The Waifs is the self-titled debut album by Australian folk band The Waifs, first released in May 1996.

Release and re-release
The Waifs was originally released on Outside Music in 1996. Based on the mainstream success of the Waifs in the early 2000s, the album was later re-released on Jarrah Records of Australia in 2003, and Compass Records in America in 2004.

Track listing
Take It In (Cunningham) - 3:42
Gillian (Cunningham) - 3:21
Circles (Simpson) - 2:58
Sunflower Man (Simpson) - 3:13
Intimate (Cunningham) - 3:25
Jealousy (Cunningham) - 4:16
Crazy Train (Simpson) - 4:19
Billy Jones (Simpson) - 3:55
Brain Damage (Cunningham) - 2:45
I Believe (Cunningham) - 3:45
Company (Simpson) - 3:25
Waif Song (Waifs) - 3:10
Shiny Apple (Cunningham) - 2:11

Personnel

Musical
Josh Cunningham - Guitar, Mandola 
Donna Simpson - Guitar, Percussion, Vocals, Group Member  
Vikki Simpson - Guitar, Harmonica, Vocals, Tin Whistle 
Jen Anderson - Mandolin, Violin, Producer, Engineer  
Mark Aspland - Percussion 
Archie Cuthbertson - Percussion

Technical
Simon Cowling - Photography  
Dylan Hughes - Engineer  
Tim Johnson - Mixing  
Tim Johnston - Mastering  
Michael Thomas - Producer, Engineer  
The Waifs - Producer

References

External links
Official site

1996 debut albums
The Waifs albums